Meat Loaf: In Search of Paradise is a 2007 independent documentary film that captures rocker Meat Loaf and his life in rehearsals and on the road during his 2007 World Tour. It was directed by Bruce David Klein and produced by Bruce David Klein and Paulina Vera Williams by Atlas Media Corp. in association with Voom HD Pictures and 10th Street Entertainment. The film was an official selection of the Montreal World Film Festival in 2007 and of the USA Film Festival in 2008. In Europe, the film was included in the 3 Bats Live DVD.  According to Allmovie, "as the stage show gets more and more involved, the singer battles ongoing health concerns."

The film was theatrically released in 75 cities in the U.S. and Canada on March 12, 2008. The premiere was held at New York City's IFC Center.  The New York Times called the film "amusing," and Variety said it was "revealing."  It is now available on DVD from Universal and can be seen on television worldwide.

References

External links 
Variety review of 'Meat Loaf: In Search of Paradise'
New York Times review of 'Meat Loaf: In Search of Paradise
Interview with Meat Loaf regarding the film 'Meat Loaf: In Search of Paradise' on Cinematical.com
 
 

Documentary films about rock music and musicians
American documentary films
2007 films
Meat Loaf video albums
2000s English-language films
2000s American films